This is a list of Near Eastern scribes. Besides the common clay tablet used in Mesopotamia, cylinder seals, stelas, reliefs, etc. are other commonly used mediums of the Near Eastern scribes.

List of scribes

References

 Metropolitan Museum of Art.  Cuneiform Texts in the Metropolitan Museum of Art:  Tablets, Cones, and Bricks of the Third and Second Millennia B.C., vol. 1 (New York, 1988).  The final section (Bricks) of the book concerns  cylinder Seals, with a foreword describing the purpose of the section as to instigate Research into cylinder Seals.  The 'cylinder sealing' on the bricks, was done multiple times per brick. Some are of high quality, and some are not.  (Also contains the only 2 el Amarna letters, in the US, with Analysis.)

See also
Cylinder seals

|LLL
Scribes
Textual scholarship